S. californica  may refer to:
 Schizopelte californica, a lichenized fungus species
 Scrophularia californica, the California figwort and California bee plant, a flowering plant species native to the western United States and British Columbia
 Scutellaria californica, the California skullcap, a plant species endemic to California
 Smilax californica, the California greenbriar, a common woody vine species native to the Western United States
 Sorbus californica, an aggregate tree species native to western North America
 Squatina californica, The Pacific angelshark, a fish species found in the eastern Pacific Ocean from Alaska to the Gulf of California and from Ecuador to Chile
 Stagmomantis californica, the California mantis, a praying mantis species native to the Western United States

See also
 List of Latin and Greek words commonly used in systematic names#C